Jonas Galusha (February 11, 1753September 24, 1834) was the sixth and eighth governor of Vermont for two terms in the early 19th century.

Biography
Galusha, born in Norwich in the Colony of Connecticut, moved with his siblings and his parents, Jacob and Lydia Huntington Galusha, to Salisbury in 1769. In 1775, his family then moved to Shaftsbury.

Galusha's father, Jacob, was a farmer and a blacksmith. Though their educations were limited and from the common schools, he and his brothers were leading men in the town and to some extent in the state.

During the American Revolution his brother David was a colonel in the Green Mountain Boys, and Galusha was a captain, fighting in the Battle of Bennington on August 16, 1777.

In 1778, Galusha married Mary Chittenden, daughter of Thomas Chittenden, Governor of the independent Republic of Vermont. The couple had nine children. Their son, Truman Galusha (The Truman Galusha House), also married into the Chittenden family, and moved his family to Jericho, VT, near Burlington. His home there is also listed on the National Register. Another son, Elon Galusha was a well-known Baptist clergyman, and famous abolitionist.

Career
A farmer and an innkeeper, Galusha was elected Sheriff of Bennington County, and served in that capacity through annual elections from 1781 to 1787.  In 1792 he was a member of the first Council of Censors after admission to the Union. (The Council of Censors met every seven years to review statutes passed by the Vermont General Assembly and ensure their constitutionality.) From 1793 to 1798 through successive elections, he was a member of the Governor's Council (a group of 12 men with powers which made it nearly equivalent to a co-ordinate branch of the legislature.  During that time, his wife, Mary, died in 1794; and he subsequently married Martha "Patty" Sammons, who died in 1797.  His third wife was Abigail Ward, who died in 1809.

Galusha was a county Assistant Judge from 1795 to 1798, and Judge from 1800 to 1806. He was a Judge of the Vermont Supreme Court in 1807 and in 1808. He married Abigail Ward in June 1808 and she died the following year. In 1808, he served as a presidential elector for the Democratic-Republican candidacy of James Madison.

The following year, Galusha was elected Governor of Vermont, serving until 1813.  He was both the predecessor and the successor of the Federalist Martin Chittenden, brother of Galusha's first wife, Mary Chittenden. During his governorship, he encouraged war with the United Kingdom in 1812. In 1814 he was a delegate to the Constitutional Convention. Galusha served another term as Governor of Vermont, elected year by year from 1815 to 1820. He was a presidential elector in the 1820 and 1824 elections.

Jonas Galusha was the namesake of Galusha Aaron Grow, a Congressman from Pennsylvania who served as Speaker of the United States House of Representatives.  Grow's aunt, who resided in Vermont, was asked to choose his name at his birth, and she selected "Galusha" because she admired Jonas Galusha, and "Aaron" because it was the name of her husband.

Death
Galusha's fourth wife, Abigail "Nabby" Atwater Beach Galusha died in 1831.  He died in Shaftsbury in 1834. He was active in the Baptist Church. He is interred at the Center Shaftsbury Cemetery, Shaftsbury, Center Shaftsbury, Bennington County, Vermont.

The Gov. Galusha Homestead

The imposing home known as The Gov. Galusha Homestead on Rt.7A in Center Shaftsbury, Vermont, is famous as one of Vermont's architectural treasures. It is listed on the National Register of Historic Places. The magnificent Palladian window over the front entrance, and many other details are the result of design by Lavius Fillmore, the famous colonial architect from Connecticut who also designed some of Vermont's finest churches in Bennington and Middlebury.  The house is also well known for several beautifully-preserved early wall paintings, rare examples of the colonial practice of using murals to imitate wallpaper, which was often unavailable in early Vermont.  They are featured in a book called Early Vermont Wall Paintings by R. L. McGrath:

In 2010, the homestead and its farmland were protected by covenants between Galusha descendants and the Vermont Land Trust.

References

External links

 Jonas Galusha: A Memoir by Pliny H. White (1866)
Vermont Historical Society
National Governors Association
The Political Graveyard

Governors of Vermont
Justices of the Vermont Supreme Court
1753 births
1834 deaths
People from Shaftsbury, Vermont
Vermont militiamen in the American Revolution
Vermont Democratic-Republicans
Vermont state court judges
Vermont sheriffs
Burials in Vermont
Democratic-Republican Party state governors of the United States
Chittenden family
18th-century American politicians
19th-century American politicians
19th-century American judges